Thandavam is a 2002 Indian Malayalam-language action film directed by Shaji Kailas, written by S. Suresh Babu, and produced by Johny Sagariga. It stars Mohanlal, Kiran Rathod, Nedumudi Venu, Captain Raju, Sai Kumar, Manoj K. Jayan, and Jagadish. Released in 86 centers, Thandavam was released to high expectations and had the highest opening-day collection at the box office in the history of Malayalam cinema at the time, although it failed to maintain it further and ended up an average grosser. The film was dubbed into Tamil and released as Erumugam.

Plot
The story centers on Kasinathan, a pragmatic but playful businessman keen on general welfare of his men, and also running a resort and massage parlour as a side business. Kasinathan is the younger brother of Swaminathan, the heir to Valiyamangalam Malika and the head of erstwhile feudal Midhilapuri. Midhilapuri is an idyllic village prospered through judicious use of agriculture as the path to good life. Kasinathan is powerful in his own right and is tipped to succeed influential politician Menon in Kerala politics. Kasinathan has a secret admirer in the form of a mysterious girl who drops messages and love hints every day. But Kasinathan has still better issues to worry about!.

The burning issue of providing drinking water supply to Udayankara colony is time and again sabotaged by Cherpunkal Shankar Das, a wily and unscrupulous politician of crassest morals who is intent on teaching a lesson to the alleged loyalty of the people who continue to support righteous politicians. The reciprocal justice is carried out by Kasinathan who in a strategic move corners Shankar Das in a compromising position with a serial actress and blackmails him to release permission for water supply in the village. Shankar Das is forced to resign from the cabinet. Ensuing celebration is amply enjoyed in a rain dance song by Kasinathan with all and sundry of his devoted satellites including characters Murugan, Vellapulli Mathachan, Tomi, Basheer, Pushpakumaran etc. Kasinathan's secret lover turns out to be Meenakshi the only sister of his good friend Commissioner Rajeevan.

The upcoming business man Dasappan Gounder and his henchmen smells an opportunity to market Cola drinks in Midhilapuri and approaches Swaminathan to start a mutually profitable business deal. Swaminathan in his idealist moral sense is staunchly against the endeavour. Disappointed Gounder joins force with Shankar Das and craftily plots death of Swaminathan in a planned operation. The disappearance of Swaminthan moderates Kasinathan to an extent. He decides to don the garb of saviour of Midhilapauri and returns to his Valiyamangalam Malika.

In a chance encounter, Kasinathan learns of the cause of death of his elder brother as planned murder perpetrated by Gounder, DYSP and Shankar Das. This unleashes the beast within him and true to his name, Kasinathan trounces on the hapless Gounder and Shankar Das to a vegetative life death end. Dasappan Gounder is lured to a barn and is thrashed to senselessness by Kasinathan. Meanwhile, Shankar Das is on a self-imposed pilgrimage to gather strength for a showdown with Kasinathan. He is eventually caught in the middle of the Kayakalpa treatment at an ashram and goes mad in the end, a just retribution to a life full of sins and debauched deeds. After sorting out the evil issues, Kasinathan is still troubled by the "gap" and decides to solve this issue once and for all by marrying his sweet heart.

Cast

Music

The film contains five songs composed by M. G. Sreekumar and one by Perumbavoor G. Raveendranath ("Himagiri Nirakal"), with lyrics by Kaithapram Damodaran. The soundtrack album was released by J. S. Audio. The background score was composed by C. Rajamani.

Box office
Released in 86 centers, Thandavam had the highest opening-day collection at the box office in the history of Malayalam cinema, although it failed to maintain it further and ended up as box office disaster as reviews were negative due to repetitive template.

References

External links
 
 Thaandavam songs

2002 films
Films scored by Perumbavoor G. Raveendranath
Films scored by M. G. Sreekumar
2000s Malayalam-language films
Indian action films
Indian gangster films
2000s masala films
2002 action films
Films directed by Shaji Kailas